This is the list of the 6 members of the European Parliament for Estonia in the 2009 to 2014 session.

List

Party representation

Notes

External links
Estonian National Electoral Committee, accessed 21 June 2009

Estonia 2009
List
2009